McKay McKinnon, M.D. is an American physician specializing in plastic surgery. He works at Saint Joseph Hospital in Chicago, Illinois, Cedars-Sinai Medical Center in Los Angeles, California and the French-Vietnam Hospital in Ho Chi Minh City, Vietnam. He graduated from medical school at the University of North Carolina School of Medicine. He completed his general surgery residency at Harvard University and his plastic surgery residency at the University of Miami. He completed plastic surgery fellowships at Children's Hospital in Boston, Massachusetts, University of Miami, and in Paris, France. He formerly served on the faculty at the University of Chicago Medical Center and worked at Lurie Children's Hospital in Chicago, Illinois.

Tumor Removal and Craniofacial Surgeries 
In 1999, McKinnon treated a Michigan woman with a large tumor disorder, neurofibroma, at the University of Chicago. He successfully removed her 200-pound tumor in an 18-hour operation that drew worldwide attention, according to USA Today. Dr. McKinnon was subsequently featured on the Oprah Winfrey Show for successfully removing the world’s biggest solid tumor.

In 2004, McKinnon was invited on a special mission to Romania to treat a similar patient with a giant neurofibroma tumor. With a team of doctors, he performed a 10-hour operation and successfully removed an 80-pound tumor from a 47-year-old woman that suffers from a genetic disorder causing tumors to grow on her body, according to BBC News. Dr. McKinnon and his team waived all fees for their service.

From 1985-2014 he led missions to Choluteca, Honduras where he performed cleft lip and palate and other reconstructive surgery. During that time, more than 500 children received treatment at no cost.

In 2011, on request of US 501(c) Tree of Life International, Sam-Ottawa of Canada-based Virtual Medical Miracle Network (VM2N) connected Dr McKinnon to Nguyen Duy Hai of Dalat Lam Dong, Vietnam, who suffered from a non-cancerous tumor weighing 198-pound (90 kg), which was growing on the right side of his abdomen. A successful 12-hour operation was performed at French Vietnam Hospital in Saigon on January 5, 2012. McKinnon waived his fee, and other costs were funded through donations. Two other tumor cases were also operated on at Saigon Cho Ray Hospital on January 6 and 7, 2012. Since then, Dr. McKinnon has been back to Vietnam 14 times, to perform many other difficult tumor and craniofacial cases. Over the course of his career, Dr. McKinnon has also provided specialty care and teaching in Belize, Honduras, India, Peru, Vietnam, Thailand, Romania, Mexico, and Portugal.

In October 2012, McKinnon was featured in the television program My Giant Face Tumor on the TLC Network. In the program, he successfully removed large facial tumors from two patients, one in Ohio and the other in Thailand, who suffer from neurofibromatosis.

In 2017 Dr. McKinnon started a 501(c)(3) certified charitable organization called SurgerySOS. The mission of SurgerySOS is to provide complex tumor and craniofacial surgery to patients without local access to such specialized care. Many of these patients have life-threatening conditions. McKinnon currently conducts surgical and teaching missions at the French Vietnam Hospital, Cho Ray Hospital, Children's Hospital II (Saigon), Hue General Hospital, and Viet Duc University Hospital in Vietnam.

During his career, McKinnon has introduced new plastic surgery techniques in nasal reconstruction, craniosynostosis, bilateral cleft lip, vascular malformations, aesthetic craniofacial surgery, orbital tumors and neurofibromatosis. He continues to lecture about aesthetic and reconstructive surgery all over the world.

References

Further reading

American plastic surgeons
Living people
Year of birth missing (living people)
University of Chicago faculty
University of North Carolina School of Medicine alumni
University of Miami staff